Official figures show that 540 people were living with HIV/AIDS in the United Arab Emirates by the end of 2006, and the number of recorded new cases is about 35 annually. The United Arab Emirates's national HIV/AIDS-prevention strategy is in the early development stages, though the National Program for AIDS Control and Prevention has been in place since 1985.

The United Arab Emirates has imposed HIV/AIDS travel restrictions on persons applying for a work or residence visa.  An HIV/AIDS test is required for work or residence permits; testing must be performed after arrival.

Migrant workers infected with HIV are denied all health care benefits. They are quarantined, and subsequently deported.

References

United Arab
Health in the United Arab Emirates